"I Didn't Know About You" is a song composed by Duke Ellington, with lyrics written by Bob Russell. Recorded in 1944 with vocal by Joya Sherrill, it was based on an instrumental first recorded by Ellington in 1942 under the title "Sentimental Lady".

The recording by Count Basie & His Orchestra (vocal by Thelma Carpenter) briefly reached the No. 21 position on the Billboard charts in 1945 and other recordings available that year were by Duke Ellington, Mildred Bailey, Jo Stafford and Lena Horne.

Reception
Alec Wilder wrote that it "works well as a song in [the] series of Ellington instrumentals with Russell lyrics. The main strain is the most melodic, vocally, of the three Russell wrote lyrics for." (The other two songs were “Do Nothing till You Hear from Me” and “Don't Get Around Much Anymore”, based respectively on "Concerto for Cootie" and "Never No Lament".)

Other notable recordings
 June Christy - The Misty Miss Christy (1956)
 Ella Fitzgerald - Ella Fitzgerald Sings the Duke Ellington Song Book (1957)
 Patti Page - In the Land of Hi-Fi (1956)
 Jo Stafford - Jo + Jazz (1960)
 Charlie Rouse and Thelonious Monk on Monk's album Straight No Chaser (1966)
 Rahsaan Roland Kirk on the album A Meeting of the Times (1972)
 Karrin Allyson on her 1992 debut album I Didn't Know About You

Notes

1944 songs
1945 singles
Songs with music by Duke Ellington
Songs with lyrics by Bob Russell (songwriter)
1940s jazz standards